A wedge issue is a political or social issue, often of a controversial or divisive nature, which splits apart a demographic or population group. Wedge issues can be advertised or publicly aired in an attempt to strengthen the unity of a population, with the goal of enticing polarized individuals to give support to an opponent or to withdraw their support entirely out of disillusionment. The use of wedge issues gives rise to wedge politics. Wedge issues are also known as hot-button or third-rail issues.

Political campaigns use wedge issues to soften tension within a targeted population. A wedge issue may often be a point of internal dissent within an opposing party, which that party attempts to suppress or ignore discussing because it divides "the base". Typically, wedge issues have a cultural or populist theme, relating to matters such as crime, national security, sexuality (e.g. same-sex marriage), abortion or race. A party may introduce a wedge issue to an opposing population, while aligning itself with the dissenting faction of the opposition. A wedge issue, when introduced, is intended to bring about such things as:

 A debate, often vitriolic, within the opposing party, giving the public a perception of disarray.
 The defection of supporters of the opposing party's minority faction to the other party (or independent parties) if they lose the debate.
 The legitimising of sentiment which, while perhaps popularly held, is usually considered inappropriate; criticisms from the opposition then make it appear beholden to special interests or fringe ideology.
 In an extreme case, a wedge issue might contribute to the actual fracture of the opposing party as another party spins off, taking voters with it.

To prevent these consequences from occurring, the opposing party may attempt to take a "pragmatic" stand and officially endorse the views of its minority faction. However, this can lead to the defection of supporters of the opposing party's majority faction to a third party, should they lose the debate.

Examples

Australia 

A case study of the use of wedge issues in practice comes from the 2001 federal election campaign in Australia. In early and mid-2001, a great deal of public attention was focused on boat people (asylum seekers arriving on unauthorised vessels), there having been several widely publicised landings of hundreds of people. On August 24, 2001, a ship illegally bearing 460 such people became distressed, and its passengers were picked up by the Norwegian cargo vessel MV Tampa.

The governing Liberal Party of Australia took the opportunity to appear tough on asylum seekers. The opposition Australian Labor Party (ALP) had a slight majority of people strongly favouring more sympathetic treatment, and was hence perceived as internally split. This provoked a fierce debate within the ALP on the relative merits of siding with national opinion (in favour of the Government's actions) or standing on party principle (opposing). But with over 90% of some television polls supporting the government's stance, the leader of the ALP Kim Beazley chose to silence the majority and agree to the tougher policy—though it ended up opposing certain elements of proposed legislation, which the Liberal Party blasted as "weak on border security".

The damage was done, with the party appearing inconsistent and divided. The Liberal Party campaigned largely on a platform of border security and increased its support at the federal election that November despite being the incumbent. Some who would typically vote Labor voted instead for the Greens and the Democrats in protest against what they saw as the ALP's complicity.

It was later claimed that the controversial campaign strategists Lynton Crosby and Mark Textor had an active role in making the Tampa incident a wedge issue for Howard to exploit.

United States 

For example, some Republican strategists have hoped that African Americans, a traditionally Democratic voting bloc, yet also one that possesses some of the most conservative views on matters of homosexuality, may be more inclined to vote for the Republican Party because of their opposition to gay marriage. In 2012, internal National Organization for Marriage memos dating to 2009 were released that stated that they sought "to drive a wedge between gays and blacks" by promoting "African American spokespeople for marriage", thus provoking same-sex marriage supporters into "denouncing these spokesmen and women as bigots", and to "interrupt" the "assimilation" of Latinos into "dominant Anglo culture" by making the stance against same-sex marriage "a key badge of Latino identity".

Likewise, Democratic strategists have hoped that the issue of stem cell research could be used as a wedge issue against the right, since some Republicans support the research while others are morally opposed to the use of embryonic cells in research.

The well known political science mantra "God, guns and gays" typifies the Republican wedge strategy crafted alongside other famous wedge issues beginning in the Nixon era, aiding the party in winning the South from the Democrats.

Reform of the laws regarding illegal immigration to the United States operated as a wedge issue in 2007. Some Republican legislators, with the backing of President George W. Bush, sought to address the dual issues of ongoing illegal immigration to the United States and the illegal status of an estimated 12 million people currently living in America. Other Republicans bitterly opposed any "amnesty" for illegal immigrants, out of fear that their constituents were unsupportive of immigration reform. Some Democrats pitched in to keep the issue alive as they recognized the issue was deeply dividing the Republican party between advocates of reform and advocates of the status quo. The result was a bitter division in Republican ranks and a stalled bill in Congress. After the election of Donald Trump in 2016, the views of American voters shifted to align more closely with their parties along partisan lines, reducing immigration policy's status as a wedge issue.

See also 
 Attack ad
 Divide and rule
 Dog-whistle politics
 Negative campaigning
 Propaganda
 Push poll
 Salami tactics

References

Political terminology of the United States
Political concepts
Populism
Political terminology in Australia